is a Japanese television personality, fashion model and gravure idol. She married Judo athlete Kosei Inoue in 2008. She is represented by Platinum Production.

Higashihara also blogs, and a tongue-in-cheek internet meme holds that items which she blogs about are certain to suffer misfortune.

References

External links
 Official agency profile 
 Official blog 

1982 births
Living people
Japanese gravure idols
Japanese female models
Japanese television personalities